Port Meadow Halt was a railway station on the Varsity Line, between north Oxford and Port Meadow. The London & North Western Railway opened the halt as Summertown on 20 August 1906 and renamed it Port Meadow Halt in January 1907. It was closed between 1 January 1917 and 5 May 1919, and the London, Midland & Scottish Railway permanently closed it on 30 October 1926. It was located on the north side of a footbridge leading from the present-day Aristotle Lane into Port Meadow, close to an occupation crossing which also gave access to the up platform.

The opening of the station marked the inauguration of a rail motor car service between Oxford and Bicester. On the opening day the rail motor ran hot at the end of a return trip from Bicester in the early part of the morning and a 2-4-2 locomotive hauling an 8-wheel corridor coach replaced it; a step-ladder had to be provided for passengers to alight as the halts were only constructed of sleepers laid at rail level. The rail motor service was withdrawn as a wartime economy measure in 1917 and restored in 1919. It was permanently withdrawn from 1926 due to the introduction of motorised bus services around Oxford.

Route

Notes

Sources

External links
 
 RAILSCOT on Buckinghamshire Railway

Disused railway stations in Oxfordshire
Former London and North Western Railway stations
Transport in Oxford
Buildings and structures in Oxford
Railway stations in Great Britain opened in 1906
Railway stations in Great Britain closed in 1917
Railway stations in Great Britain opened in 1919
Railway stations in Great Britain closed in 1926